The 2008 Hong Kong Legislative Council election was held on 7 September 2008 for the 4th Legislative Council since the establishment of the Hong Kong Special Administrative Region. There were 60 seats in the 4th Legislative Council, with 30 members elected by geographical constituencies through direct elections, and 30 members by functional constituencies. Candidates for 14 functional constituency seats were unopposed.

The turnout rate was 45 percent with 1.51 million voters casting the ballots, about 10 percent lower than the previous election in 2004. The Democratic Alliance for the Betterment of Hong Kong (DAB) remained the largest single party in the Legislative Council with 13 seats if including the two members of the Hong Kong Federation of Trade Unions (FTU) while the pro-business Liberal Party suffered a big defeat by losing the two heavyweights, chairman James Tien and vice-chairwoman Selina Chow lost their seats in the New Territories East and the New Territories West. The duo resigned from their party positions and Chow resigned from the Executive Council after the election, which was followed by a great split of the party.

In the backdrop of a deteriorating economy and rising inflation, the pro-grassroots parties scored victories as the new pro-democracy party League of Social Democrats (LSD) had their three candidates elected and the FTU also won in two seats in the geographical constituencies. The pro-democracy flagship party Democratic Party retook the second largest party status despite losing one seat to its ally, the new middle-class oriented Civic Party which took two seats in Hong Kong Island with party leader Audrey Eu stood as the second candidate behind party's new face Tanya Chan.

The share of the pan-democratic parties' vote among voters dropped from 60 percent in 2004 to 57 percent, which translated into a net loss of two seats compared to the last election. The pan-democrats were elected to a total of 23 seats, 19 seats in the directly elected geographical constituencies, and four seats from the functional constituencies. By virtue of having in excess of one-third of the seats in Legislative Council, their ability to veto constitutional changes remained intact. The pan-democrats' veto power was seen as crucial for the electoral arrangements for the 2012 Legislative Council election, which would take place during this session.

Pre-election issues
The Standing Committee of the National People's Congress vote in December 2007 to allow universal suffrage by 2017, and full Legislative Council elections by 2020, tempered the debate on universal suffrage. Wary of political parties, the government sought to defer discussion on other highly sensitive issues until October 2008, in the hopes that the election will be void of focus. The election was therefore fought over issues regarding the minimum wage, health care reform, Old Age Allowance, and the future of RTHK. Also, the case surrounding former Housing Director Leung Chin-man served to highlight the issue of systematic checks and balances, and the lack of political scrutiny of government actions.

Commentators, such as Albert Cheng, noted that the fighting between pro-democracy parties was heating up, but forecast few changes in the overall party standings of the new Council. He cited proportional representation as a mechanism, which built in protection for a multi-party system.

There were some concerns that those seeking the right of abode in Hong Kong felt pressured by lobbyists supporting the DAB. Two advocacy groups echoed abode-seekers' in being bombarded with telephone calls and other pressures to vote for the DAB, or for Regina Ip.

Deputy ministers appointment controversy

Inflation relief measures

Leung Chin-man appointment controversy

Candidates
A total of 142 candidates on 53 lists entered the election via the geographical constituencies, making it the most contested election since the handover of Hong Kong. The candidates of both the pan-democracy and pro-Beijing coalitions stated that they would not allocate the votes within each camp, leading to infighting inside the caucuses. Martin Lee and Anson Chan announced that they would not stand, and would endorse other candidates. In addition, some incumbent legislators such as Audrey Eu of the Civic Party and Yeung Sum of the Democratic Party were placed second on their lists in an attempt to get less experienced members of their parties elected.

Beijing's involvement in the elections was an open secret: its strategy was to elect a new batch of "independent" aspirants with profession backgrounds and without a strong pro-Beijing image, such as Scarlet Pong, and eventual winners Regina Ip and Priscilla Leung. It had hoped they would appeal to the middle class voters and steal votes from the pan-democratic parties.

The functional constituencies were less competitive: 14 out of the 30 seats were uncontested. The Accounting and Architectural, Surveying and Planning functional constituencies were the most contested, with 5 candidates competing in each constituency. 45 candidates in total ran for the 16 contested seats.

Retiring incumbents
Ten incumbents chose not to run for re-election.

Opinion polling

Results

A record number of 3.37 million people registered to vote in the election. The turnout rate was low, at 45% with 1.51 million voters casting ballots.

Commentator Chris Yeung believed that the Liaison Office operated behind the scenes to co-ordinate votes for the pro-Beijing camp. These independents managed to secure seats, but apparently not at the expense of support for the pan-democrats.

The Democratic Alliance for the Betterment of Hong Kong remained the largest single party in Council, with 13 seats. The share of the pan-democratic parties' vote among voters dropped from 60% in 2004 to 57%, which translated into a net loss of 2 seats. The pan-democrats were elected to a total of 23 seats, 19 seats in the directly elected geographical constituencies, and four seats from the functional constituencies. The pan-democrats' veto power were crucial for the electoral arrangements for the 2012 elections, which will take place during this Council.

In the backdrop of a deteriorating economy and rising inflation, voters shifted their preferences towards more radical and grass-roots politicians; the electorate's suspicions of collusion between government and big business dealt a blow to the Liberal Party. The Liberal Party suffered double defeat when Selina Chow and chairman James Tien lost their seats in the New Territories West and New Territories East geographical constituencies respectively. Their bid to secure seats in other constituencies also failed. Tien resigned as the Liberal Party's chairman after his defeat, and Chow resigned both her vice-chairmanship and her seat on the Executive Council of Hong Kong. The election of three members of the League of Social Democrats and four trade-unionists to Legco is set to pose a challenge to the government on welfare and livelihood issues.

Share of votes of the parties by polling stations:

Before election:

Change in composition:

|-
! style="background-color:#E9E9E9;text-align:center;" rowspan=2 colspan=3 |Parties and allegiances
! style="background-color:#E9E9E9;text-align:right;" colspan=4 |Geographical constituencies
! style="background-color:#E9E9E9;text-align:right;" colspan=4 |Functional constituencies
! style="background-color:#E9E9E9;text-align:right;" rowspan=2 |Totalseats
! style="background-color:#E9E9E9;text-align:right;" rowspan=2 |±
|-
! style="background-color:#E9E9E9;text-align:right;" |Votes
! style="background-color:#E9E9E9;text-align:right;" |%
! style="background-color:#E9E9E9;text-align:right;" |±pp
! style="background-color:#E9E9E9;text-align:right;" |Seats
! style="background-color:#E9E9E9;text-align:right;" |Votes
! style="background-color:#E9E9E9;text-align:right;" |%
! style="background-color:#E9E9E9;text-align:right;" |±pp
! style="background-color:#E9E9E9;text-align:right;" |Seats
|-
|rowspan=4 style="background-color:Pink;border-bottom-style:hidden;"|
|style="background-color:"|
| style="text-align:left;" |Democratic Alliance for the Betterment and Progress of Hong Kong
|347,373
|22.92
|0.19
|7
|259
|0.21
|N/A
|3
|10
|1
|-
|style="background-color:"|
| style="text-align:left;" |Liberal Party
|65,622
|4.33
|2.39
|0
|4,089
|3.34
|1.37
|7
|7
|3
|-
|style="background-color:"|
| style="text-align:left;" |Hong Kong Federation of Trade Unions
|86,311
|5.70
|2.73
|2
| –
| –
| –
|2
|4
|1
|-
|style="text-align:left;background-color:"|
| style="text-align:left;" | Pro-Beijing individuals and others
|103,162
|6.81
| −
|2
|33,633
|27.50
|–
|14
|16
|−
|-style="background-color:Pink"
| style="text-align:left;" colspan=3 |Total for pro-Beijing camp
|602,468
|39.75
|2.35
|11
|37,981
|31.06
|1.47
|26
|37
|
|-
|rowspan=10 style="background-color:LightGreen;width:4px;border-bottom-style:hidden;"|
|style="background-color:;width:4px"|
| style="text-align:left;" |Democratic Party
|312,692
|20.63
|4.56
|7
|41,331
|33.80
|3.15
|1
|8
|1
|-
|style="background-color:"|
| style="text-align:left;" |Civic Party
|207,000
|13.66
|7.04
|4
|9,187
|7.51
|
|1
|5
|1
|-
|style="background-color:"|
| style="text-align:left;" |League of Social Democrats
|153,390
|10.12
|N/A
|3
| –
| –
| –
| –
|3
|1
|-
|style="background-color:"|
| style="text-align:left;" |Neighbourhood and Worker's Service Centre
|42,441
|2.80
|0.53
|1
| –
| –
| –
| –
|1
|0
|-
|style="background-color:"|
| style="text-align:left;" |Hong Kong Confederation of Trade Unions
|42,366
|2.80
|1.15
|1
| –
| –
| –
| –
|1
|0
|-
|style="background-color:"|
| style="text-align:left;" |Hong Kong Association for Democracy and People's Livelihood
|42,211
|2.79
|1.43
|1
| –
| –
| –
| –
|1
|0
|-
|style="background-color:"|
| style="text-align:left;" |The Frontier 
|33,205
|2.19
|4.70
|1
| –
| –
| –
| –
|1
|0
|-
|style="background-color:"|
| style="text-align:left;" |Civic Act-up
|30,887
|2.04
|0.05
|1
| –
| –
| –
| –
|1
|1
|-
|style="background-color:"|
| style="text-align:left;" |Hong Kong Social Workers' General Union
| –
| –
| –
| –
|5,334
|4.36
|1.90
|1
|1
|1
|-
|style="text-align:left;background-color:"|
| style="text-align:left;" | Pro-democracy individuals and others
|37,515
|2.48
| −
|0
|18,276
|14.95
|–
|1
|1
|−
|-style="background-color:LightGreen"
| style="text-align:left;" colspan=3 |Total for pan-democracy camp
|901,707
|59.50
|2.94
|19
|74,128
|60.62
|2.19
|4
|23
| 3
|-
| bgcolor="" |
| style="text-align:left;" colspan=2 |Councillors without formal affiliation with any political party
|11,304
|0.75
| −
|0
|10,173
|8.32
| –
|0
|0
|0
|-

|style="text-align:left;background-color:#E9E9E9" colspan="3"|Total
|width="75" style="text-align:right;background-color:#E9E9E9"|1,515,479
|width="40" style="text-align:right;background-color:#E9E9E9"|100.00
|width="40" style="text-align:right;background-color:#E9E9E9"|
|style="text-align:right;background-color:#E9E9E9"|30
|width="75" style="text-align:right;background-color:#E9E9E9"|122,282
|width="40" style="text-align:right;background-color:#E9E9E9"|100.00
|width="40" style="text-align:right;background-color:#E9E9E9"|
|style="text-align:right;background-color:#E9E9E9"|30
|width="30" style="text-align:right;background-color:#E9E9E9"|60
|style="text-align:right;background-color:#E9E9E9"|0
|-
|style="text-align:left;background-color:#E9E9E9" colspan=13| 
|-
|style="text-align:left;background-color:#E9E9E9" colspan="3"| Valid votes
|width="75" style="text-align:right;background-color:#E9E9E9"| 1,515,479
|width="30" style="text-align:right;background-color:#E9E9E9"| 99.42
|width="30" style="text-align:right;background-color:#E9E9E9"| 0.20
|width="30" style="text-align:right;background-color:#E9E9E9" rowspan="4" | 
|width="75" style="text-align:right;background-color:#E9E9E9"| 122,282
|width="30" style="text-align:right;background-color:#E9E9E9"| 95.56
|width="30" style="text-align:right;background-color:#E9E9E9"| 0.85
|width="30" style="text-align:right;background-color:#E9E9E9" colspan="3" rowspan="4" | 
|-

|style="text-align:left;background-color:#E9E9E9" colspan="3"| Invalid votes
|width="75" style="text-align:right;background-color:#E9E9E9"| 8,770
|width="30" style="text-align:right;background-color:#E9E9E9"| 0.58
|width="30" style="text-align:right;background-color:#E9E9E9"| 0.20
|width="75" style="text-align:right;background-color:#E9E9E9"| 5,691
|width="30" style="text-align:right;background-color:#E9E9E9"| 4.44
|width="30" style="text-align:right;background-color:#E9E9E9"| 0.85
|-
|style="text-align:left;background-color:#E9E9E9" colspan="3"|Votes cast / turnout
|width="75" style="text-align:right;background-color:#E9E9E9"|1,524,249
|width="40" style="text-align:right;background-color:#E9E9E9"|45.20
|width="40" style="text-align:right;background-color:#E9E9E9"|
|width="75" style="text-align:right;background-color:#E9E9E9"|127,973
|width="40" style="text-align:right;background-color:#E9E9E9"|60.30
|width="40" style="text-align:right;background-color:#E9E9E9"|9.84

|-
|style="text-align:left;background-color:#E9E9E9" colspan="3"|Registered voters
|width="75" style="text-align:right;background-color:#E9E9E9"|3,372,007
|width="40" style="text-align:right;background-color:#E9E9E9"|100.00
|width="40" style="text-align:right;background-color:#E9E9E9"|5.14
|width="75" style="text-align:right;background-color:#E9E9E9"|212,227
|width="40" style="text-align:right;background-color:#E9E9E9"|100.00
|width="40" style="text-align:right;background-color:#E9E9E9"|
|-
| style="text-align:left;" colspan=13 |Source: Hong Kong government
|}
Note: Candidates in 14 functional constituencies were elected uncontested to the Legislative Council. The number of seats for the Hong Kong Federation of Trade Unions in the geographical constituencies exclude Wong Kwok-hing, Wong Kwok-kin and Pan Pey Chyou, who are also DAB members; figures in parentheses in the pan-democracy and pro-Beijing total percentage exclude all votes of other individuals.

Votes summary

Seat summary

Incumbents defeated
Ten incumbents lost re-election

Candidates lists and results

Geographical Constituencies (30 seats)
Voting system: Party-list proportional representation with largest remainder method and Hare quota.

Functional Constituencies (30 seats)
Voting systems: Different voting systems apply to different functional constituencies, namely for the Heung Yee Kuk, Agriculture and Fisheries, Insurance and Transport, the preferential elimination system of voting; and for the remaining 24 FCs used the first-past-the-post voting system.

See also
Legislative Council of Hong Kong
2010 Hong Kong by-election

Notes

References

External links
Legislative Council of Hong Kong
Electoral Affairs Commission

 
L
2008 elections in China
2008 in Hong Kong
Legislative Council of Hong Kong
September 2008 events in China